Fly! is a flight simulator video game for Windows and Macintosh developed by Terminal Reality and published by Gathering of Developers.

Gameplay

It includes simulation of air traffic control features as well as aircraft's on-board systems, and was acclaimed for its highly detailed fully working interactive cockpits. Featured aircraft are fixed-wing light to medium aircraft. An enhanced version, Fly! 2K, and add-on, Wilco's 737 for Fly!, were released in 2000. Fly! 2K added user-created add-ons, enhanced graphics, real world and real-time weather generation via the ability to import METAR reports from NOAA, and support for Roger Wilco. The improvements were made available for owners of the original Fly! via a free patch. Another version titled Fly! 2K: German Edition was released in early 2001. It added Ruhr area to the game. It is intended to replace the Fly! 2 main program (exe) and remain fully compatible with previous versions, scenery, aircraft, etc. The first publicly available version was released in 2010.

Development
The game was in development for more than three years.

Reception

Fly! and Fly! 2K received mixed or average reviews according to the review aggregation website GameRankings. It sold 93,000 units by October 2001.

Sequel
Fly! II is a sequel to Fly! released on April 26, 2001 for Windows and Macintosh. Macintosh version was distributed by MacSoft. Said sequel and Fly! 2K sold combined 47,000 units by October 2001.

Reception
{{Video game reviews
| title = Fly! II
| GR = 56%
| CGW = 
| Gamekult = 6/10
| GSpot = 6.0/10
| GStar = 52%53% (German Edition)
| JXV = 13/20
| rev1 = Inside Mac Games
| rev1Score = 6.75/10
| rev2 = MacAddict
| rev2Score = 
}}
Danny Atkin for Computer Gaming World said "Fly! II is this year's poster child for programs shoved out the door before completion–publisher Gathering of Developers not only shipped FLY! II with bugs and missing features, it even left out most of the manual. The shame of it all is that the finished parts are quire good, and developer Terminal Reality has been very quick to post patches and missing terrain data."See alsoFlight Unlimited IIIMicrosoft Flight Simulator 2000Microsoft Flight Simulator 2002X-Plane''

References

External links 
Official Fly! II website (archived)
Fly! at Terminal Reality (archived)
Fly! II at Terminal Reality (archived)
Fly at Gathering of Developers (archived)
Fly! II at Gathering of Developers (archived)

1999 video games
General flight simulators
Classic Mac OS games
Video games developed in the United States
Video games with expansion packs
Windows games
Take-Two Interactive franchises
Flight simulation video games
Gathering of Developers games
Terminal Reality games
Single-player video games